Paul Hughes may refer to:

Paul Hughes (athlete), British Paralympic athlete
Paul Hughes (footballer) (born 1976), English footballer
Paul Hughes (priest) (born 1953), Archdeacon of Bedford
Paul Hughes (rugby league), rugby league footballer

See also  
 Hughes (surname)